CUGBP Elav-like family member 4 (CELF4) also known as bruno-like protein 4 (BRUNOL4) is a protein that in humans is encoded by the CELF4 gene.

Function 

Members of the CELF/BRUNOL protein family contain two N-terminal RNA recognition motif (RRM) domains, one C-terminal RRM domain, and a divergent segment of 160-230 aa between the second and third RRM domains. Members of this protein family regulate pre-mRNA alternative splicing and may also be involved in mRNA editing, and translation. Several transcript variants encoding different isoforms have been found for this gene, but their full-length nature has not been determined yet.

References

External links

Further reading